Monster Island (released as Isla Calaca in Mexico) is a 2017 English-language Mexican computer animated horror comedy film directed by Leopoldo Aguilar. The film was produced by Ánima Estudios and animated by India's Discreet Arts Production.

The film was first released in the United Kingdom on 21 July 2017, and later in Mexico on 14 September 2017. The film was released in the United States on 1 September 2017 on home media and VOD platforms.

Plot
A teenage boy journeys to a monstrous-like island to find his true form after discovering he's not a human being.

Voice cast

Spanish-language cast
Memo Aponte as Lucas
Octavio Rojas as Nicolas
Pepe Toño Macías as Norcutt
Alicia Barragán as Veronica
Ángela Villanueva Vargas as Carlotta
Luis Daniel Ramírez as Fergus
Ricardo Tejedo as Giraldo
Alan F. Velazquez & Gerardo Alonso as Shiro and Kuro

English-language cast

Phillip Adrian Vasquez as Lucas
Roger L. Jackson as Nicolas
Johnny Rose as Norcutt
Alicia Barragán as Veronica
Katie Leigh as Carlotta / Patrick's Mom
Eric Larsen as Peter / Ant Monster
Michael Robles as Cameron
Nancy Sullivan as Dina / Old Lady / Teacher
Jenifer Beth Kaplan as Melanie / Cameron's Mom / Patrick
Joey Camen as Shiro / Fergus / Mayor's Assistant
Wally Wingert as Kuro / Lagoon Monster
Chuck Kourouklis as Durgo / Dock Master
Erik Brada as Giraldo / Mongo
Luis Daniel Ramírez Santiago as Watson
Anthony Budai as Mayor

Production
In an interview with El Universal, director Leopoldo Aguilar said the purpose of the film's story is to help the audience understand their roots and learn to accept them. "Lucas is a teenager who lives this path, [and] he makes a trip to accept himself as the monster he is," Aguilar stated. "I think everyone at that age went through that process - to know what place we occupy in the world and try to discover ourselves," he added. Producer and Ánima COO José C. García de Letona mentioned about the film's "comedy and action" tone, in comparison to the Leyendas franchise. "It has elements to differentiate from the Leyendas, and this one, since it is a film designed for something global and[...] the public that we want to reach, there's not much suspense," stated Aguilar.

Animation
The film was animated entirely in computer-generated imagery, done by India's Discreet Arts Productions which has previously collaborated with Anima Estudios' previous films including Guardians of Oz and Top Cat Begins.

Music
The film's original music was composed by Kevin Smithers.

Release
To date, the film has been released in Mexico, United States, and the United Kingdom, as well as Asian territories including China and South Korea.

The release in China marked a new first for production company Ánima Estudios, to which Leopoldo Aguilar stated that the film's story was created for a global setting, and not Mexico where the film was produced. "Narratively[,] we wanted a funny story[...] that walks a lot without locating it in a place in Mexico[.] [I]t can be anywhere in the world[...] that already gives another face to the production," said Aguilar.

Box office
The film debuted at #3 in Mexico, grossing $6.86 million (est. US$0.4 million) on its opening weekend. It grossed a total of $18.9 million pesos.

Reception
The film was met with negative reviews upon its release.

Awards & nominations

Awards and nominations

See also
Ánima Estudios
Guardians of Oz
Top Cat Begins

References

External links

IMCINE profile (Spanish)

2017 films
2017 computer-animated films
2017 horror films
2010s adventure comedy films
2010s children's comedy films
2010s fantasy comedy films
Ánima Estudios films
2010s children's adventure films
2010s children's fantasy films
Films set on fictional islands
Indian animated films
Indian 3D films
Mexican animated films
Mexican children's films
2010s Spanish-language films
Halloween horror films
2017 comedy films
2010s English-language films
2010s Mexican films
2017 multilingual films
Indian multilingual films
Mexican multilingual films